Knock Knock is the seventh studio album by Bill Callahan, released under his Smog alias. It was originally released through Drag City in January 1999. In Europe, it was released through Domino Recording Company.

Critical reception

Heather Phares of AllMusic gave the album 4.5 out of 5 stars, calling it "Bill Callahan's subtlest collection of songs yet." She added, "It's a moving album on many levels; not only do the songs have Smog's usual emotional intimacy, their subjects move away from difficult, claustrophobic situations toward maturity and acceptance."

Michele Romero of Entertainment Weekly gave the album a grade of B+, saying, "The energy jolt serves him well, making the delicate broken spirit of his lyrics cathartic rather than depressing."

NME listed it as the 10th best album of 1999. Steve Jelbert of The Independent named it the best pop album of 1999.

Track listing

References

External links
 

1999 albums
Bill Callahan (musician) albums
Drag City (record label) albums
Domino Recording Company albums
Albums produced by Jim O'Rourke (musician)